Carlos Capriles Ayala (16 March 1923 – 10 February 2014) is a Venezuelan journalist and historian, and a former Ambassador of Venezuela in Spain during Rafael Caldera's presidency tenure. He is co-founder along with his brother, Miguel Ángel Capriles Ayala, of La Cadena Capriles, Capriles Publications and became Vice-President from 1950 to 1977. Founding editor of the Maracaibo daily Critica (1965–68), el "Vespertino de Maracaibo", news magazines "Elite" and "Momento" and lastly "El Mundo" tabloid.

He is the author of a of two books only, including a biography of Venezuelan dictator Marcos Pérez Jiménez. He is co-author of the three-volume Diccionario de la corrupción en Venezuela (Dictionary of Corruption in Venezuela). He protagonized and fomented the defence for free expression, free press and the constitution of the democracy in Venezuela. He was politically persecuted during the dictatorship of Marcos Perez Jimenez, during which he was thrown in jail and afterwards sent into exile. His thirst for adventure was expressed by his arrival to Spain as Ambassador of Venezuela in the early 1970s, by crossing the Atlantic Ocean sailing his beloved VITO sailboat. In his role as Ambassador, Carlos signed several peace treaties and was awarded several decorations, like the Great Order of Hispanic Culture Institute, the Order of Liberatator of Venezuela and the Knight Grand Cross of Spain's Order of Isabella the Catholic in 1972. Carlos Capriles Ayala died on February 10, 2014.

He graduated in history from the Central University of Venezuela. He is the brother of Miguel Ángel Capriles Ayala.

Books
 Vida y muerte de la democracia: López Contreras y Medina Angaria vs. Rómulo Betancourt y Pérez Jiménez, 1999, Ediciones Capriles.
 Origen de la corrupción en Venezuela, desde Páez hasta Caldera, 1996, Ediciones Capriles.
 Decadas de historia de Venezuela, 1994, Ediciones Capriles. 
 Todos los golpes a la democracia venezolana, 1992, Ediciones Capriles. 978-9806201187
 Sexo y poder en la historia: Concubinas reales y presidenciales en Venezuela desde Manuelita Saenz hasta Cecilia Matos, 1991 (6th edition), Ediciones Capriles. 
 Sola, a traves de la selva amazonica, 1988, Ediciones Bexeller. 
 Un burdel de postin: Una historia de novela, 1988, Ediciones Bexeller. 
 Perez Jimenez y su tiempo: Biografia del ex-presidente y radiografia de Venezuela en algunas etapas estelares de su historia, 1985.  Three Volumes.

References

Venezuelan journalists
Venezuelan newspaper chain founders
20th-century Venezuelan historians
Venezuelan male writers
People from Puerto Cabello
1923 births
Central University of Venezuela alumni
Knights Grand Cross of the Order of Isabella the Catholic
Ambassadors of Venezuela to Spain
2014 deaths